Inness may refer to:

 Gary Inness (born 1949), a Canadian ice hockey goaltender
 George Inness (1825-1894), an American landscape painter
 George Inness, Jr. (1854-1926), an American figure and landscape artist, and son of George Inness
 Inness-Fitts House and Studio/Barn, a historic house in Medfield, Massachusetts
 Mathew Inness (born 1978) an Australian cricket player